The Solomonic dynasty, also known as the House of Solomon, was the ruling dynasty of the Ethiopian Empire formed in the thirteenth century. Its members claim lineal descent from the biblical King Solomon and the Queen of Sheba. Tradition asserts that the queen gave birth to Menelik I after her biblically described visit to Solomon in Jerusalem. In 1270, the Zagwe dynasty was overthrown by Yekuno Amlak, who claimed descent from Solomon and founded the Solomonic era of Ethiopia. The dynasty lasted until 1974, ended by a coup d'état and the deposition of Haile Selassie, who was a Solomonic prince through his grandmother.

History

The Solomonic dynasty, a bastion of Ethiopian Orthodox Christianity, came to rule Ethiopia on 10 Nehasé 1262 EC (10 August 1270 CE) when Yekuno Amlak overthrew the last ruler of the Zagwe dynasty at the Battle of Ansata.

Yekuno Amlak claimed direct male line descent from the old Axumite royal house that the Zagwes had replaced on the throne. Menelik II, and later his daughter Zewditu I, would be the last Ethiopian monarchs who could claim uninterrupted direct male descent from Solomon of Israel and the Queen of Sheba (both Lij Iyasu and Haile Selassie I were in the female line, Lij Iyasu through his mother Shewarega Menelik, and Haile Selassie I through his paternal grandmother, Tenagnework Sahle Selassie). The male line, through the descendants of Menelik's cousin Dejazmatch Taye Gulilat, still existed, but had been pushed aside largely because of Menelik's personal distaste for this branch of his family. The Solomonic Dynasty continued to rule Ethiopia with few interruptions until 1974, when the last emperor, Haile Selassie I, was deposed. The royal family is currently non-regnant. Members of the family in Ethiopia at the time of the 1974 revolution were imprisoned; some were executed and others exiled. In 1976, ten great-grandchildren of Haile Selassie I were extracted from Ethiopia in an undertaking later detailed in a book by Jodie Collins, titled Code Word: Catherine. The women of the dynasty were released by the regime from prison in 1989, and the men were released in 1990. Several members were then allowed to leave the country in mid-1990, and the rest left in 1991 upon the fall of the communist régime. Many members of the Imperial family have since returned to live in Ethiopia.

During much of the dynasty's existence, its effective realm was the northwestern quadrant of present-day Ethiopia, the Ethiopian Highlands. The Empire expanded and contracted over the centuries, sometimes incorporating parts of modern-day Sudan and South Sudan, and coastal areas of the Red Sea and Gulf of Aden. Southern and eastern regions were permanently incorporated during the last two centuries, some by Shewan kings and some by Emperors Menelik II and Haile Selassie I; although much of the central and southern regions were previously incorporated into the empire under Amda Seyon I and Zara Yaqob, peripheral areas were lost after the invasion of Ahmad Gragn. In the modern era, the Imperial dynasty has several cadet branches. The elder Gondarine Amhara line, starting with Susenyos in 1606 (although often credited to his son Fasilides who established his capital at Gondar) ended its rule with the fall of the largely powerless Yohannes III in 1855 and the coming to power of Tewodros II, whose later claims of Solomonic descent were never widely accepted. Following Tewodros, Wagshum Gobeze claimed the throne linking himself to the last independent Gondare emperors through his mother, Aychesh Tedla, a descendant of Iyasu I, and reigned as emperor of Ethiopia with the title Tekle Giorgis II for some years,  highly investing in the renovation of churches and monuments in Gondar. Being also an heir to the Zagwe throne, his reign was meant to be a unification of both dynasties in the enthronement of a king bearing both lineages. Tekle Giorgis II fought a battle with the Tigrean Claimant Kassai Mercha (Yohannes IV), and the latter, who had retrieved superior weaponry and armament from the British in return for his assistance in the defeat of Tewodros II, would be able to defeat Tekle Giorgis II's army, imprisoning and killing him. The Tigrean line came to power briefly with the enthronement of Yohannes IV in 1872, and although this line did not persist on the Imperial throne after the Emperor was killed in battle with the Mahdists in 1889, the heirs of this cadet branch ruled Tigray until the revolution of 1974 toppled the Ethiopian monarchy.

The Tigrean Cadet branch (along with its various sub-branches) traces its lineage to the main Solomonic line of Emperors through at least two female lines. The more recent link was through Woizero Aster Iyasu (wife of Ras Mikael Sehul, daughter of Mentewab and her lover, Melmal Iyasu, a Solomonic prince and nephew of Mentewab's late husband Bakaffa).

The Shewan line was next on the Imperial throne with the coronation of Menelik II, previously Menelik King of Shewa, in 1889. The Shewan Branch of the Imperial Solomonic dynasty, like the Gondarine line, could trace uninterrupted male line descent from King Yekonu Amlak, though Abeto Negassi Yisaq, the grandson of Dawit II by his youngest son Abeto Yaqob. The direct male line ended with Menelik II, who was succeeded first by the son of his daughter Lij Iyasu from 1913 to 1916, then by his daughter Zewditu until 1930, and finally by the son of a first cousin in the female line, Haile Selassie I. Haile Selassie's reign lasted until 1974, when the dynasty was removed from power. His grandson Prince Zera Yacob is his legal heir and therefore the current head of the imperial dynasty. The Shewan branch has several sub-branches, most notably the Selalle line established by Menelik II's uncle Ras Darge.

The oldest junior cadet branch of the Solomonic Dynasty is the Gojjam branch which traces its ancestry through various lines of the main branch of the Solomonic dynasty. One of the more prominent lines comes from Princess Walata Israel, the daughter of Melmal Iyasu and Empress Mentewab. She married Dejazmach Yosedek, who gave rise to the Gojam Imperial House by means of their child "Talaku" Ras Hailu. The Princes of Gojam, which include Ras Merid Hailu (son of Ras Hailu Yosedek), Ras Goshu Zewde, Tekle Haymanot of Gojjam, Dejazmach Tadla Gwalu and Ras Desta Tadla all claim royal blood through the main Gonder Imperial House through Empress Mentewab and the Solomonic Prince Melmal Iyasu. Its most recent members include Tekle Haimanot, King of Gojjam; his son Leul Ras Hailu Tekle Haimanot, who was the most senior Ethiopian noble who submitted to the Italian occupation of 1936–1941; and his nephew Ras Hailu Belew, who was a noted figure in the resistance against the Italian occupation.

Coat of arms

The Imperial coat of arms was adopted by Haile Selassie I, and is currently held by his direct heir in the male line, Prince Zera Yacob, and by the Crown Council of Ethiopia. The arms are composed of an Imperial Throne flanked by two angels, one holding a sword and a pair of scales, the other holding the Imperial sceptre. The throne is often shown with a Christian cross and a Star of David, representing the Christian and Jewish traditions. It is surmounted by a red mantle with the Imperial Crown, and before the throne is the Lion of the Tribe of Judah. The Lion of Judah was the central emblem of the Ethiopian tricolour  during the reign of the monarchy, and now serves as the chief symbol of the Ethiopian monarchist movement. The Lion of Judah has also been adopted as the leading religious symbol for the Rastafari movement (a Western, African diasporic religious movement) that regards Emperor Haile Selassie as divine.

The phrase "Moa Ambassa ze imnegede Yehuda" (Conquering Lion of the Tribe of Judah) appeared on the arms, and always preceded the Emperor's official style and titles.

The full title of the Emperor of Ethiopia was Negusa Nagast and Seyoume Igziabeher (Ge'ez: ሥዩመ እግዚአብሔር; "Elect of God"). The title Moa Anbessa Ze Imnegede Yehuda ("Conquering Lion of the Tribe of Judah") always preceded the titles of the Emperor. It was not a personal title but rather referred to the title of Jesus and placed the office of Christ ahead of the Emperor's name in an act of Imperial submission. Until the reign of Yohannes IV, the Emperor was also Neguse Tsion (Ge'ez: ንጉሠ ጽዮን, 'nəgusä tsiyon)', "King of Zion"), whose seat was at Axum, and which conferred hegemony over much of the north of the Empire (see: Ethiopian aristocratic and court titles).

Gallery

See also 
 List of emperors of Ethiopia
Emperors of Ethiopia Family tree
 Ethiopian aristocratic and court titles
 Crown Council of Ethiopia
 Order of Solomon
 Order of Saint Mary of Zion

References

Bibliography 
 Marie-Laure Derat , Le domaine des rois éthiopiens (1270-1527), Paris, Publications de la Sorbonne, 2003, 383 pp.

 

African royal families
Ethiopian noble families
States and territories established in 1270
1974 disestablishments in Africa
1270 establishments
13th-century establishments in Africa
Davidic line
Monarchism in Ethiopia